Mamqan (also Romanized as Mamqān and Mamaqān; also known as Māmāgān)  is a city in Mamqan District of Azarshahr County, East Azerbaijan province, Iran. At the 2006 census, its population was 10,872 in 3,258 households. The following census in 2011 counted 13,359 people in 3,606 households. The latest census in 2016 showed a population of 11,892 people in 3,937 households, all Azerbaijanis. Mamqan is the largest producer of chickpeas in the world.

References 

Azarshahr County

Cities in East Azerbaijan Province

Populated places in East Azerbaijan Province

Populated places in Azarshahr County